Glory Bassey Johnson (born July 27, 1990) is an American basketball player for Turkish club Beşiktaş. Born in Colorado Springs, Colorado, she went to Webb School Of Knoxville and played collegiately for the University of Tennessee Lady Vols. She holds a Montenegrin passport and has represented the Montenegro national team internationally.

College career
Johnson enrolled at the University of Tennessee-Knoxville in 2008. She recorded 36 double-doubles over the course of her college career.

Johnson completed her bachelor's degree in global studies in three years, and earned a master's degree in communications during her fourth year of basketball eligibility.

College statistics 

Source

USA Basketball
Johnson played on the team representing the US at the 2011 Summer Universiade held in Shenzhen, China. The team won all six games to earn the gold medal. Johnson scored 6.2 points per game and had nine steals, tied for second place on the team.

Professional career

WNBA
Johnson was selected in the first round of the 2012 WNBA Draft (4th overall) by the Tulsa Shock. In her rookie season, she was ranked fourth in steals per game (a career-high 2.1 spg).

In 2013 and 2014, her second and third seasons with the Shock, Johnson was named in the Western Conference All-Star team.

Johnson sat out the 2015 WNBA season on a maternity leave after announcing her pregnancy.

She returned one month into the 2016 WNBA season after her suspension stemming from her domestic violence incident with Brittney Griner. By this time the Tulsa Shock had relocated to Dallas and were renamed the Dallas Wings, Johnson had re-signed with the team during free agency. Johnson averaged 11.3 ppg in 18 games with 6 starts. Also during her comeback season, she recorded the league's 16th 20-point, 20-rebound performance of the season in a win against the Phoenix Mercury when she scored 23 points along with a career-high 22 rebounds.

During the 2017 season, Johnson continued to put double-doubles in rebounds and points which is what she has become statistically known for earlier on in her career. On June 18, 2017, Johnson score a season-high 27 points in an 87–83 win over the Washington Mystics. From July 31 to August 6, Johnson named the Western Conference player of the week. On August 19, 2017, Johnson recorded her 13th double-double of the season, scoring 23 points along with 13 rebounds in a 90–86 win over the Atlanta Dream. During the game, Johnson threw a punch at Dream's point guard Matee Ajavon and served a one-game suspension two days later. The Wings would finish with a 16–18 record and the number 7 seed in the league. In her first career playoff game, Johnson scored 15 points and grabbed 14 rebounds in a losing effort to the Washington Mystics in the first round elimination game.

In 2018, Johnson had a bit of a challenging season with a couple injuries sidelining her for a few games and causing her to play some games off the bench. She played 29 games with 17 starts and would average career-lows in scoring and rebounding. The Wings would still make the playoffs with a 15–19 record and the 8th seed in the league. They would once again be a first-round exit as they lost to the Phoenix Mercury.

Overseas
From 2012 to 2015, Johnson played three off-seasons in Russia for two different teams; Chevakata Vologda and Nadezhda Orenburg. As of November 2016, Johnson signed with the Xinjiang Tiashan Deers of the WCBA for the 2016–17 off-season. In August 2018, Johnson signed with Hatay BB of the Turkish League for the 2018–19 off-season.

Personal life
On August 14, 2014, it was announced that Johnson and fellow WNBA player Brittney Griner were engaged. On April 22, 2015, both women were arrested for physically attacking each other after police broke up a fight between the two in their Goodyear, Arizona, home. Both sustained minor injuries during the incident. Nevertheless, they stayed together and married on May 8, 2015. It was announced on June 4, 2015 that Johnson was pregnant and that she would miss the 2015 WNBA season. One day later, Griner filed for annulment which was rejected. Johnson gave birth to twin girls in October 2015, 16 weeks premature. The twins were conceived by IVF treatment using her eggs and a sperm donation. The divorce was finalized in June 2016.

WNBA career statistics

Regular season

|-
| style="text-align:left;"| 2012
| style="text-align:left;"| Tulsa
| 34 || 28 || 28.2 || .482 || .000 || .677 || 6.8 || 1.1 || 2.1 || 0.5 || 2.0 || 11.5
|-
| style="text-align:left;"| 2013
| style="text-align:left;"| Tulsa
| 29 || 28 || 30.2 || .446 || .333 || .747 || 8.9 || 1.1 || 1.0 || 0.4 || 2.0 || 15.0
|-
| style="text-align:left;"| 2014
| style="text-align:left;"| Tulsa
| 33 || 33 || 32.4 || .449 || .000 || .760 || 9.2 || 1.4 || 1.3 || 0.3 || 2.6 || 14.7
|-
| style="text-align:left;"| 2016
| style="text-align:left;"| Dallas
| 18 || 6 || 27.9 || .442 || .286 || .753 || 8.9 || 1.3 || 0.9 || 0.6 || 1.4 || 11.3
|-
| style="text-align:left;"| 2017
| style="text-align:left;"| Dallas
| 33 || 33 || 31.0 || .464 || .313 || .766 || 9.1 || 1.6 || 1.2 || 0.3 || 2.2|| 14.9
|-
| style="text-align:left;"| 2018
| style="text-align:left;"| Dallas
| 29 || 17 || 22.5 || .417 || .315 || .780 || 6.0 || 1.3 || 1.0 || 0.4 || 1.3 || 8.0
|-
| style="text-align:left;"| 2019
| style="text-align:left;"| Dallas
| 28 || 19 || 24.1 || .364 || .340 || .583 || 5.1 || 1.4 || 1.4 || 0.6 || 1.0 || 7.3
|-
| style="text-align:left;"| 2020
| style="text-align:left;"| Atlanta
| 18 || 1 || 15.4 || .373 || .262 || .500 || 3.7 || 0.6 || 0.8 || 0.4 || 0.7 || 4.7
|-
| style="text-align:left;"| Career
| style="text-align:left;"| 8 years, 2 teams
| 222 || 165 || 27.2 || .440 || .311 || .728 || 7.4 || 1.3 || 1.3 || 0.5 || 1.8 || 11.4

Playoffs

|-
| style="text-align:left;"| 2017
| style="text-align:left;"| Dallas
| 1 || 1 || 36.8 || .375 || .000 || .750 || 14.0 || 0.0 || 1.0 || 1.0 || 1.0 || 15.0
|-
| style="text-align:left;"| 2018
| style="text-align:left;"| Dallas
| 1 || 1 || 22.1 || .500 || .333 || .000 || 5.0 || 2.0 || 1.0 || 0.0 || 1.0 || 7.0
|-
| style="text-align:left;"| Career
| style="text-align:left;"|2 years, 1 team
| 2 || 2 || 29.4 || .409 || .250 || .750 || 9.5 || 1.0 || 1.0 || 0.5 || 1.0 || 11.0

References

1990 births
Living people
Montenegrin women's basketball players
American women's basketball players
American emigrants to Montenegro
African-American basketball players
All-American college women's basketball players
American expatriate basketball people in China
Atlanta Dream players
Basketball players from Colorado Springs, Colorado
Dallas Wings players
Guangdong Vermilion Birds players
Lesbian sportswomen
LGBT basketball players
LGBT people from Colorado
American LGBT sportspeople
McDonald's High School All-Americans
Parade High School All-Americans (girls' basketball)
People from Maricopa County, Arizona
Power forwards (basketball)
Sportspeople from the Phoenix metropolitan area
Tennessee Lady Volunteers basketball players
Tulsa Shock draft picks
Tulsa Shock players
Universiade gold medalists for the United States
Universiade medalists in basketball
Women's National Basketball Association All-Stars
Xinjiang Magic Deer players
Medalists at the 2011 Summer Universiade
21st-century African-American sportspeople
21st-century African-American women
United States women's national basketball team players